The rivière des Fèves is a tributary of the Châteauguay River. It flows in the municipalities of Saint-Urbain-Premier and Sainte-Martine, in the Beauharnois-Salaberry Regional County Municipality, in the region administrative Montérégie, Quebec, Canada).

The course of the river is served on the northeast side by the Rivière-des-Fèves North road and on the southwest side by the Rivière-des-Fèves Sud road.

The river surface is generally frozen from mid-December to the end of March. Safe circulation on the ice is generally done from the end of December to the beginning of March. The water level of the river varies with the seasons and the precipitation.

Geography 

The main hydrographic slopes neighboring the Rivière-des-Fèves are:
 north side: Châteauguay River;
 east side: Clermont stream, Noire river;
 south side: Rivière des Anglais;
 west side: Châteauguay River, Bouchard stream, rivière des Anglais.

Rivière-des-Fèves rises west of the hamlet "Norton Creek", north of Chemn des Bourdeau.

Throughout its course towards the northwest, the river is bordered by a road on the northeast side (rang de la Rivière des Fèves Nord) and another on the southwest side (rang de la Rivière des Fèves Sud), except its last segment.

Toponymy 

The toponym "Rivière des Fèves" was formalized on December 5, 1968, at the Commission de toponymie du Québec.

See also 

 List of rivers of Quebec

References 

Rivers of Montérégie
Beauharnois-Salaberry Regional County Municipality